George Sansonetis is an American para-alpine skier. He represented the United States at four Winter Paralympics: in 1998, 2002, 2006 and 2010.

In 1998 he won the silver medal in the Men's Giant Slalom LW9 event and the bronze medal in the Men's Super-G LW9 event.

References 

Living people
Year of birth missing (living people)
Place of birth missing (living people)
Paralympic alpine skiers of the United States
American male alpine skiers
Alpine skiers at the 1998 Winter Paralympics
Alpine skiers at the 2002 Winter Paralympics
Alpine skiers at the 2006 Winter Paralympics
Alpine skiers at the 2010 Winter Paralympics
Medalists at the 1998 Winter Paralympics
Paralympic silver medalists for the United States
Paralympic bronze medalists for the United States
Paralympic medalists in alpine skiing